Gravelly Branch is a  long 4th order tributary to the Nanticoke River in Sussex County, Delaware.

Variant names
According to the Geographic Names Information System, it has also been known historically as:
Gravel Creek
Gravely Branch

Course
Gravelly Branch rises in Ellendale Swamp on the Sowbridge Branch divide about 1 mile south-southeast of Ellendale, Delaware, and then flows southwest to join the Nanticoke River about 2 miles northeast of Middleford.

Watershed
Gravelly Branch drains  of area, receives about 45.2 in/year of precipitation, has a wetness index of 741.95, and is about 19% forested.

See also
List of rivers of Delaware

References

Rivers of Delaware
Rivers of Sussex County, Delaware